József Kürthy (14 July 1881 – 18 June 1939) was a Hungarian actor. He was born in Szatmárnémeti, Austria-Hungary (now Satu Mare, Romania) and died in Budapest.

Selected filmography
 The Village Rogue (1916)
 St. Peter's Umbrella (1917)
 Jön az öcsém (1919)
 Szép Ilonka (1920)
 Budai cukrászda (1935)
 Varjú a toronyórán (1938)
 Süt a nap (1938)
 Hungary's Revival (1939)

Bibliography
 Cunningham, John. Hungarian Cinema: From Coffee House to Multiplex. Wallflower Press, 2004.

External links

1881 births
1939 deaths
People from Satu Mare
Hungarian male film actors
Hungarian male silent film actors
20th-century Hungarian male actors